Acantholimon koeycegizicum, is a species of plant belonging to the family Plumbaginaceae.

It is only found in coastal regions of southwestern Anatolia (Turkey), often associated with forests of Turkish Pine. It is a robust, rather spiny shrublet which produces dense spikes of pink flowers borne on long (up to 30 cm) scapes. Flowering occurs in July and August.

References

koeycegizicum
Plants described in 2003
Flora of Turkey